Gaël Monfils was the defending champion but decided not to compete.

Julien Benneteau won the title, defeating Steve Johnson in the final, 6–3, 6–2.

Seeds

  Julien Benneteau (champion)
  Steve Johnson (final)
  Kenny de Schepper (semifinals)
  Paul-Henri Mathieu (withdrew)
  Sergiy Stakhovsky (first round)
  David Goffin (quarterfinals)
  Jiří Veselý (quarterfinals)
  Malek Jaziri (quarterfinals)

Draw

Finals

Top half

Bottom half

External Links
 Main Draw
 Qualifying Draw

BNP Paribas Primrose Bordeauxandnbsp;- Singles
2014 Singles